Ashby Magna was a station on the Great Central Railway, the last main line to be constructed from the north of England to London, which opened in 1899 to serve the Leicestershire village of Ashby Magna.

Architecturally, the station was very similar to Whetstone in that it comprised a single island platform designed by Alexander Ross which allowed the tracks to pass either side of a central platform, and was intended to facilitate future expansion of the railway. Access to the station was via a stairway which led down from the road bridge on Station Road.

History

Opened by the Great Central Railway, it became part of the London and North Eastern Railway during the Grouping of 1923. The station then passed to the London Midland Region of British Railways on nationalisation in 1948. It was then closed by the British Railways Board.

The site today

The station closed along with the railway line in 1969, and today little remains of it. The construction of the M1 motorway (which occurred whilst the line was still open) to the east of the station resulted in the demolition of the stationmaster's house and the loss of the goods yard. Today, a timber merchant occupies the site and remains of the cattle dock are still visible.

References 

 
 
 Station on navigable O. S. map

Disused railway stations in Leicestershire
Former Great Central Railway stations
Railway stations in Great Britain opened in 1899
Railway stations in Great Britain closed in 1969
Beeching closures in England
1899 establishments in England
Harborough District